Cell Biology International is a peer-reviewed scientific journal published by Portland Press for the International Federation for Cell Biology. The journal was established in 1977 as Cell Biology International Reports and published by Elsevier, obtaining its current name in 1993. The journal was transferred to Portland Press in 2010. It covers all aspects of cell biology.

Abstracting and indexing
The journal is abstracted and indexed in:
 BIOBASE
 BIOSIS
 Chemical Abstracts Service
 Current Contents
 EMBASE
 MEDLINE/Index Medicus
 Science Citation Index
According to the Journal Citation Reports, the journal has a 2010 impact factor of 1.747.

See also
Autophagy (journal)
Cell and Tissue Research

References

External links 
 
 International Federation for Cell Biology website

Molecular and cellular biology journals
Monthly journals
English-language journals
Publications established in 1977